Baruth/Mark is a town in the Teltow-Fläming district of Brandenburg, Germany. It is situated 24 km east of Luckenwalde, and 53 km south of Berlin.

Geography 
Baruth/Mark is structured in the following parts of town, which are all villages and mainly former municipalities:

 Baruth/Mark 
 Klein Ziescht
 Dornswalde
 Groß Ziescht 
 Kemlitz 
 Horstwalde
 Klasdorf
 Glashütte
 Ließen
 Merzdorf
 Mückendorf
 Paplitz
 Petkus
 Charlottenfelde
 Radeland
 Schöbendorf

Demography

Photogallery

Sons and daughters of the town

 Christian Kunth (1757-1829), educator, educator of Alexander and Wilhelm von Humboldt
 Johann Gottlob Nathusius (1760-1835), entrepreneur
 Johann Georg Lehmann (1765-1811), surveyor and cartographer
 Friedrich zu Solms-Baruth (1795-1879), politician, member of Prussian parliament
 Ewald von Lochow (1855-1942), Prussian general
 Feodora Schenk (1920-2006), German athlete

References

Localities in Teltow-Fläming
Teltow-Fläming
Fläming Heath